Carsaig Bay is a cove on the Ross of Mull in the south of the Isle of Mull, off the west coast of Scotland.
The bay is small and is surrounded by high, precipitous hills. It is unsafe for water craft, except in the part sheltered by the island of Gamhnach Mhòr, where small vessels can obtain anchorage. Three of the rocks are marked by perches to facilitate the approach to Carsaig Quay. The tidal streams along the south coast of Mull are weak westward of Carsaig Bay.

Geography and geology
The bay is on the south coast of  the Ross of Mull and extends from Rubh' a' Chromain in the west to Carraig Mhòr in the east. 

This area affords some shelter by Gamhnach Mhòr. The Carsaig Arches, a natural formation situated at Malcolm's Point, are located west of the bay.

One of the well known caves here is known as the Nuns Cave where nuns from the Iona Abbey used to escape from the rigours of reformation and hide here. The use of some of these caves reportedly dates back to the 6th century. It is also reported that during the 15th century, the monks (1500 of them) of the Iona Abbey used to visit the shores and caves here to collect sea washed stones and carve them into artifacts and grave stones. Other formations seen are weathered sills and dykes. Fossils are a frequent find here. The site has sedimentary rocks of Palaeocene age. Cretaceous strata recorded here has geological formations of sandstones and mudstones with several chalk clasts. The sill formation noted here is the Rubh' a'Chromain which is formed of felsite, basalt and xenoliths.

Flora and fauna
The flora, a distinct feature on the road to the bay, is of wild strawberry and scented woodbine. The fauna noted during the low tide in the bay are oystercatcher and terns Other fauna reported are wild goats, golden eagles and sea eagles and also kittiwakes and fulmars which breed here.

Media and the arts
Carsaig Pier and the boathouses, together with Carsaig House, feature extensively in the 1945 film I Know Where I'm Going!, as does the incongruous telephone box next to the waterfall.

References

Bays of Argyll and Bute
Landforms of the Isle of Mull